The Marriage of Strongbow and Aoife is an oil-on-canvas painting by Daniel Maclise, painted in 1854. It is owned by and on permanent display in the National Gallery of Ireland, Dublin.

Description
The painting depicts the 1170 marriage of the Norman knight Richard de Clare, 2nd Earl of Pembroke ("Strongbow") to the Irish princess Aoife Ní Diarmait in Christ Church Cathedral, Waterford. It is portrayed as a pivotal moment in the Norman conquest of Ireland and the death of Gaelic Ireland.

In the foreground are the bodies of dead Irish warriors. To the left is a broken-stringed Celtic harp. Richard stands on a broken high cross.

History
The painting was completed by Maclise in 1854. It was initially commissioned to stand in the chamber of the House of Lords in the Palace of Westminster.

It was presented to the National Gallery in 1879 by Sir Richard Wallace, 1st Baronet. 

Bank of America Merrill Lynch paid for its restoration in 2010–17.

Notes

1854 paintings
Paintings by Daniel Maclise
Collection of the National Gallery of Ireland
History paintings
Musical instruments in art